Grobelno may refer to:

 Grobelno, Poland, a village in Malbork County in northern Poland
 Grobelno, Slovenia, a settlement in the municipalities of Šmarje pri Jelšah and Šentjur in eastern Slovenia